Strickland is an English toponymic surname derived from the manor of Strickland in the historical county of Westmorland, now Cumbria, England, represented geographically by the modern villages of Great Strickland and Little Strickland. The surname dates as far back as the 12th century in Westmorland, and is also found at an early date in the Scottish counties of Ayrshire and Lanarkshire.

Etymology 
The surname Strickland (early forms include Stirkeland) is derived from the place-name Stercaland, given to a manor in the former county of Westmorland near Penrith, Cumbria. The place-name is Old English, from stirc, styr(i}c or steorc bullock, and land, a piece of land or pasture.

History 

The earliest known Strickland was a late-12th century landholder named Walter of Castlecarrock, who married Christian of Letheringham, an heiress to the landed estate that covered the area where the villages of Great Strickland and Little Strickland are now. After this marriage Walter became known as Walter de Strickland, spelt in various ways.

When Sir William de Stirkeland (1242–1305) married Elizabeth Deincourt (or d'Eyncourt), Sizergh Castle became the seat of this Strickland gentry family.  A descendant, Thomas Strykeland is said to have carried the banner of St. George at the Battle of Agincourt in 1415.  They also had a family chapel in the Kendal Parish Church (Holy Trinity), and both Kendal and Penrith have main roads called Stricklandgate (The 'gate' element is from Old Norse gata, street). Other local landmarks include Strickland Wood, Warton near Carnforth.

They also gave their name to one of their properties, a settlement that first appeared on the west side of present-day Kendal with a Motte and Bailey fortification on it that became known as Kirkbie Strickland (Kirkbie is from Old Norse Kirkju, church, and by, village.).

A Strickland gentry family seated at Gilsland was granted a coat of arms blazoned: Sable, three escallops argent, meaning "three white scallops on a black field".

List of persons with the surname Strickland
Agnes Strickland, English historical writer and poet
Alice Harrell Strickland, American politician and activist who was the first woman elected mayor in the U.S. state of Georgia
Amzie Strickland, American TV and radio actress
Audra Strickland, American politician
Bill Strickland, American community leader (Pittsburgh, Pennsylvania)
Catharine Parr Traill, born Catharine Strickland, early emigrant from England to Canada
Charles Strickland (disambiguation), several people
David Strickland, American actor
Donald Strickland, American football cornerback
Donna Strickland, Canadian physicist, 2018 Nobel laureate
Earl Strickland, American pool player
Edgar Harold Strickland, English entomologist
Erick Strickland, American basketball player
Gail Strickland (born 1947), American film/television actress
Gerald Strickland, 1st Baron Strickland (1861–1940), Maltese and British politician and peer
Sir George Strickland, 7th Baronet (1782–1874), also known as Sir George Cholmley, an English Member of Parliament and lawyer
Hugh Edwin Strickland (1811–1853), British naturalist
Hunter Strickland, American baseball player
Joey Strickland, retired U.S. Army colonel and Veterans Affairs Secretary for the state of Louisiana
Jim Strickland (disambiguation), several people
John Estmond Strickland (Hong Kong), UK-born former Chairman of The Hong Kong and Shanghai Banking Corporation
Joseph Strickland, American prelate of the Roman Catholic Church
Josh Strickland, American singer/actor
KaDee Strickland, American actress
Keith Strickland, American musician
Mabel Strickland, Anglo-Maltese journalist and politician
Margaret Strickland, American judge
Margaret Strickland, English writer of magazine stories and novels for adults and children,
Marilyn Strickland, American politician
Mark Strickland, American basketball player
Michael Strickland (disambiguation), several people
Peter Strickland (British Army officer),  British Army officer who commanded the 1st Infantry Division during the First World War 
Randolph Strickland, American politician
Robert Strickland, English landowner, politician and soldier
Rod Strickland,  American basketball coach and former professional basketball player
Roy C. Strickland, American politician/businessman
Sean Strickland, American mixed martial artist
Shirley Strickland, Australian athlete
Stan Strickland, American musician
Stephanie Strickland, American poet
Stephon Strickland, American professional wrestler professionally known as Isaiah "Swerve" Scott
Susanna Moodie (Strickland), UK-born Canadian author
Ted Strickland, American politician
Terry A. D. Strickland, American convicted murderer who, until his arrest, was one of the FBI's Ten Most Wanted Fugitives
Tom Strickland, American lawyer and politician
Thomas Strickland (cavalier), English politician and soldier
Walter Strickland, English politician and diplomat who held high office during the Protectorate
William Strickland (disambiguation), several people

See also
Strickland (disambiguation)
Strickland-Constable baronets
Strickland Propane, a fictional propane and propane accessories supplier in the animated series King of the Hill

References

English toponymic surnames